Social Animals is a 2018 American documentary film directed by Jonathan Ignatius Green about three teenagers growing up on Instagram. The film premiered at the South by Southwest Film Festival and was released in the United States on December 11, 2018.

Premise 
A daredevil photographer, an aspiring swimsuit model, and a midwest girl next door are all looking for the same things from their Instagram accounts––a little love, acceptance and fame––and they’ll do just about anything to get it. Social Animals peeks into the digital and real worlds of today’s teenager, where followers, likes and comments mark success and self worth.

Appearances 
 Kaylyn Slevin
 Humza Deas
 Emma Crockett Robinson
 Ravi Vora

Release 
Social Animals was shown at many film festivals including South By Southwest on March 9, 2018.

 SF DocFest
 Newport Beach Film Festival
 KC Film Fest
 Tallinn Black Nights Film Festival
 Not Film Festival
 Beat Film Festival

Reception 

References

External links 
 
 
 

2018 films
American documentary films
Films about social media
2010s English-language films
2010s American films